The Graham-Crocker House is a historic home located at 30 North Main Street, Bel Air, Harford County, Maryland, United States. It is a -story frame dwelling with a shed addition to the south and an ell to the west, and dating to about 1825.

The Graham-Crocker House was listed on the National Register of Historic Places in 1980.

References

External links
, including photo from 1979, Maryland Historical Trust

Houses on the National Register of Historic Places in Maryland
Houses in Bel Air, Harford County, Maryland
Houses completed in 1825
National Register of Historic Places in Harford County, Maryland